Astragalus oocarpus is a rare species of milkvetch known by the common names San Diego milkvetch and Descanso milkvetch.

It is endemic to southern California, where it is known only from the Peninsular Ranges of San Diego County. Its range may extend north into Riverside County. It is a plant of the chaparral slopes and woodlands of the mountains.

Description
Astragalus oocarpus is a perennial herb producing upright to erect hollow stems up to 1.3 meters tall. Leaves are up to 17 centimeters long and are made up of veiny lance-shaped leaflets each up to 3 centimeters in length. The stem and leaves are mostly hairless.

The inflorescence holds up to 75 cream-colored flowers, each between 1 and 2 centimeters in length. The fruit is an inflated legume pod 1.5 to 2.5 centimeters long which dries to a stiff papery texture.

See also
California chaparral and woodlands
California montane chaparral and woodlands
Natural history of the Peninsular Ranges

References

External links
Jepson Manual Treatment — Astragalus oocarpus
USDA Plants Profile: Astragalus oocarpus
Sierra Club Rare Plants Profile - Astragalus oocarpus (c.1994)

oocarpus
Endemic flora of California
Natural history of the California chaparral and woodlands
Natural history of the Peninsular Ranges
Natural history of San Diego County, California
Flora of Riverside County, California